Pajaka Landscape Conservation Area is a nature park which is located in Rapla County, Estonia.

The area of the nature park is 202 ha.

The protected area was founded in 1958 to protect oak-spruce mixed forest at Hiie Farmstead (Märjamaa Parish). In 2006, the protected area was designated to the landscape conservation area.

References

Nature reserves in Estonia
Geography of Rapla County